How Big Is Your Love is a 2011 Algerian drama film written and directed by Fatma Zohra Zamoum. The film had its North American premiere at the Palm Springs International Film Festival.

Cast
 Nourdine Alane as Rachid
 Nadjia Debahi-Laaraf as Khadidja
 Louiza Habani as Safia
 Nadjia Laaraf-Debbahi as Khadidja
 Abdelkader Tadjer as Lounes
 Racim Zennadi as Adel

References

External links
 

2011 films
2010s Arabic-language films
2011 drama films
Algerian drama films